Kyle 'Marbles' Nakazawa (born March 16, 1988 in Torrance, California) is a retired American soccer player.

Career

College and Amateur
Nakazawa grew up in Rancho Palos Verdes, California, and attended Palos Verdes Peninsula High School from 2002 to 2003, before moving to the Edison Academic Center from 2003–2005 where he was a part of the U.S. U-17 residency program. Nakazawa played college soccer at UCLA from 2006 to 2009; he was named to the 2006 Soccer America and Top Drawer Soccer All-Freshman first teams and College Soccer News' All-Freshman second team, was a 2007 Second-team All-Pac-10 selection and UCLA Bruins MVP, and was a 2009 First-team NSCAA All-American, an All-Far West selection, a First-team All-Pac-10 selection, and a Pac-10 All-Academic honoree. He played club soccer for the Irvine Strikers.

During his college years he also appeared for both the San Fernando Valley Quakes and the Los Angeles Legends in the USL Premier Development League.

Professional
Nakazawa was drafted in the third round (33rd overall) of the 2010 MLS SuperDraft by Philadelphia Union. Known for providing a steady presence in the midfield and excellent service balls, he made his professional debut on May 1, 2010, in a match at Los Angeles Galaxy. Nakazawa made his first professional start on May 8, 2010 at Real Salt Lake, and he scored his first professional goal on May 28, 2011, in the Union's 6–2 victory over Toronto FC.

On February 1, 2012 Nakazawa was traded to Los Angeles Galaxy with a 2013 MLS SuperDraft second round pick for a 2012 international roster slot.

On January 21, 2013, Los Angeles Galaxy head coach Bruce Arena announced that Nakazawa had retired from playing professional soccer.

International
Nakazawa was present at the 2005 FIFA U-17 World Cup at Peru, scoring 2 goals.

Career statistics

Club

Updated February 1, 2012

Personal
Nakazawa has also dabbled in acting, and he was featured in JoJo’s music video for her 2006 hit song, Too Little Too Late alongside several of his UCLA Bruins teammates.

Kyle is now a U.S. Forest Service firefighter for the Arroyo Grande Hotshots in Arroyo Grande, California.

See also
 History of the Japanese in Los Angeles

References

External links
 
 UCLA bio

1988 births
Living people
All-American men's college soccer players
American soccer players
American sportspeople of Japanese descent
Association football midfielders
LA Galaxy players
LA Laguna FC players
Major League Soccer players
People from Arroyo Grande, California
People from Rancho Palos Verdes, California
Philadelphia Union draft picks
Philadelphia Union players
San Fernando Valley Quakes players
Soccer players from California
Sportspeople from Los Angeles County, California
UCLA Bruins men's soccer players
United States men's youth international soccer players
USL League Two players